Pioneer Chicken (or Pioneer Take Out, as it is officially named) is an American fried chicken restaurant chain which was founded in Echo Park, Los Angeles in 1961 by H. R. Kaufman. When Kaufman sold the chain in 1987, there were 270 restaurants operated by 220 franchisees.

During the 1970s, several locations operated in Honolulu on the island of Oahu, Hawaii. As of 2021, there are only two locations remaining, one in the Boyle Heights district of Los Angeles and the other in Bell Gardens, California, both unrelated former franchises.

Origins
It was named after Pioneer Market, a now-defunct small chain of supermarkets in Los Angeles. The original location in Echo Park was located next to the 1980s-era Pioneer Market (the original 1932 market was razed in the 1980s due to the Sylmar earthquake) at Echo Park Avenue and Sunset Boulevard, which was replaced by a Walgreens Pharmacy in 2004.  Due to considerable redevelopment activity in the neighborhood, the original Pioneer Chicken location was shut down in March 2009 and replaced by a Little Caesar's Pizza the following year. During the 1980s, Los Angeles Lakers announcer Chick Hearn and former football player O. J. Simpson advertised for the restaurant.

Pioneer Chicken was remembered for its bright orange deep fried chicken (pictured right), menu option of gizzards and livers as appetizers, and Pioneer Pete, the company mascot and protagonist in comic books that were provided with their kid's meals.

Bankruptcy
In 1988 founder H. R. Kaufman and business associate Terrence P. Goggin filed for Chapter 11 in Federal Bankruptcy Court.  At that point, Pioneer Chicken had 220 franchise owners and 270 stores. The company faltered under competition pressure from Kentucky Fried Chicken.

AFC Enterprises acquisition
In 1993, Popeyes Chicken & Biscuits owner AFC Enterprises purchased the franchise and converted most locations to Popeyes.

Locations

There are two remaining locations in the Los Angeles area: 1) 904 S. Soto Street, Los Angeles; 2) 6323 E. Florence Avenue, Bell Gardens.

In Indonesia
In 1983, three Indonesian alumni from the University of Southern California decided to open a Pioneer Chicken franchise in Jakarta under the name California Fried Chicken.

As of 2013, the parent company of the stores in Indonesia, Pioneerindo Gourmet International, have over 200 CFC restaurants throughout that nation. CFC had a few franchises in Shanghai during the 1990s, but they may not currently exist.

See also
 List of fast-food chicken restaurants

Further reading
 
 Vintage Pioneer Chicken Sign Heading to Museum Los Angeles Magazine March 2, 2016

References

1961 establishments in California
Bell Gardens, California
Chicken chains of the United States
Companies that filed for Chapter 11 bankruptcy in 1988
Fast-food chains of the United States
Fast-food poultry restaurants
History of Los Angeles
Restaurants established in 1961
Restaurants in Los Angeles